Thorvald Bindesbøll (21 July 1846 – 27 August 1908) was a Danish National romantic architect, sculptor and ornamental artist.  He designed the Dragon Fountain, Copenhagen (Dragespringvandet) and is perhaps best known as the creator of the Carlsberg beer label, which has remained unchanged since it was introduced.

Biography
Bindesbøll was born in Copenhagen, Denmark.  Born into an artistic family; he was the son of architect Michael Gottlieb Bindesbøll (1800–1856) and wife Andrea Frederikke Andersen (1819-1899). His sister Johanne Bindesbøll was a successful textile artist.

He attended the Royal Danish Academy of Fine Arts and left as an architect in 1876.
Marginalized as an architect, Bindesbøll turned increasingly towards the art of craftsmanship.
As early as 1880, he came into the field of pottery encouraged by the friend and architect Andreas Clemmensen.
He began producing ceramics at Frauens Levarefabrik.
He worked at Johan Wallmann in Utterslev 1883–90, between  1890 and 1891, he worked with faience at Kähler in Næstved and at G. Eifrig in Valby 1891–1904. By 1904 he was working with Danish gold and silversmith  Holger Kyster (1872–1944). Throughout the years Bindesbøll had an intimate collaboration with August Jerndorff and Joakim Skovgaard. He received international notice  at the Paris Exposition Universelle (1900) where he won the gold medal for his décor of the Danish exhibition. 
With A. Michelsen, he designed a number of cutlery piece.  Bindesboll had a preference to decorate the entirety of the handle of his pieces in broad scrolling floral patterns, or heavy geometric patterns.

Bindesbøll died at Frederiksberg and was buried at Frederiksberg Ældre Kirkegård.

See also
List of Danish architects
Thorvald Bindesbøll Medal

References

External links
Biography

1846 births
1908 deaths
Artisans from Copenhagen
Royal Danish Academy of Fine Arts alumni
Danish architects
19th-century Danish ceramists
20th-century Danish ceramists
Danish designers
Danish sculptors
Danish male artists
Male sculptors